The name Ketsana was used for two tropical cyclones in the western north Pacific Ocean. The name was contributed by Laos and is a type of perfumed tree.

 Typhoon Ketsana (2003) (T0317, 20W, Tisoy) – remained over the open ocean.
 Typhoon Ketsana (2009) (T0916, 17W, Ondoy) – struck the Philippines and causing massive flooding in Metro Manila and other provinces nearby.

The name Ketsana was retired after the 2009 Pacific typhoon season and was replaced by "Champi" beginning in the 2015 season.

Pacific typhoon set index articles